This is a defunct tennis tournament on the WTA Tour that was held just once, in 1993. It was held in Sapporo, Japan from September 27 to October 3 and was a Tier IV event.  The official name of the tournament was the Sapporo Ladies Open.

Past finals

Singles

Doubles

See also
List of tennis tournaments

References
 Sapporo Ladies Open results

External links

Defunct tennis tournaments in Japan
Sapporo
Sports competitions in Sapporo
Recurring sporting events established in 1993
1993 establishments in Japan